Jorge Toledo Luis (born 10 December 1966) is a Mexican politician affiliated with the Institutional Revolutionary Party. As of 2014 he served as Deputy of the LX Legislature of the Mexican Congress representing Oaxaca.

References

1966 births
Living people
Politicians from Oaxaca
Institutional Revolutionary Party politicians
21st-century Mexican politicians
People from Juchitán de Zaragoza
Deputies of the LX Legislature of Mexico
Members of the Chamber of Deputies (Mexico) for Oaxaca
Members of the Senate of the Republic (Mexico) for Oaxaca